The Azerbaijani women's football league is the top-level women's football league of Azerbaijan. It is organized by the national women's football association.

The league was played out from 2003 for some years. After that there first were no leagues and then only youth (U15, U17) ones. 

The winning team of the league qualified for a spot in the UEFA Women's Cup. Gömrükçü Baku has represented Azerbaijan five times from 2002–03 to 2006–07 and reached a quarter-final. Ruslan-93 Baku played the Women's Cup in 2007–08.

The first season after the hiatus was held in 2016/17 with Gabala FK winning the title. Sumgayit FK would win the next title before the league would return to a hiatus. It appears to have run for half a season in 2021-22, but no further information is available.

List of champions 
The list of champions:
2003/04: Gömrükçü Baku
2004: Gömrükçü Baku
2005: Gömrükçü Baku
2006: Ruslan-93
2007: Ruslan-93
youth leagues only

2016/17: Gabala FK
2017/18: Sumqayıt FK

References

External links 
 Official Website of the Football Federation

Top level women's association football leagues in Europe
Women's football competitions in Azerbaijan
Women